Clare Elizabeth Gough (born 7 September 1982) is an English former cricketer who played as a right-arm bowler and right-handed batter. She appeared in three One Day Internationals for England in August 2001, making her debut against Scotland. She played domestic cricket for West Midlands and Staffordshire.

References

External links
 
 

Living people
1982 births
Cricketers from Wolverhampton
England women One Day International cricketers
Staffordshire women cricketers
West Midlands women cricketers